Hugh Thomas (born 1949) is a Welsh actor, probably best known for his appearances in several popular Welsh television series, such as Pobol y Cwm, High Hopes, and Satellite City. He has also appeared in television series outside Wales, such as Not the Nine O'Clock News and Freud, as well as several films, including if...., The Tall Guy, and Breaking Glass.

Filmography

References

External links
 

1949 births
Living people
Welsh male film actors
Welsh male television actors